CSBC Corporation, Taiwan (literally "Taiwan International Shipbuilding Corporation") is a company that produces ships for civilian and military use in Taiwan. It is headquartered in Kaohsiung, with shipyards in Kaohsiung and Keelung. It was a state-owned enterprise before privatization via an IPO in 2008.

Operations 
In 2021 government and naval vessels accounted for 60% of CSBC’s operations.

Modification and repair 
As of 2019 ship repair accounted for 3–5% of CSBC revenues, with the company working to increase that share because of favorable margins in the space.

In 2019 CSBC Corp. completed a green retrofit of a 13,000 TEU container ship owned by Orient Overseas Container Line. Modifications included a flue gas desulfurization system to bring the ship into compliance with United Nations IMO 2020 emissions goals.

History

CSBC Corporation, Taiwan, formerly known as China Shipbuilding Corporation (CSBC), is the result of the merger of Taiwan Shipbuilding Corporation and China Shipbuilding Corporation.

Shipbuilding in Taiwan began in 1937 during the Japanese colonial period when Mitsubishi Heavy Industries Corporation founded the Taiwan Dockyard Corporation. Following Japan's defeat in World War II, the Republic of China authorities established Taiwan Machinery and Shipbuilding Company by merging the existing Taiwan Dockyard Corporation with Taiwan Steel Works and Tōkō Kōgyō Corporation. Two years later, in 1948, the company split into two state-owned companies called Taiwan Machinery Corporation and Taiwan Shipbuilding Corporation (TSBC).

China Shipbuilding Corporation (CSBC) was founded in 1973 and reverted to a government-owned company in 1977. CSBC and TSBC merged in 1978 and was known as China Shipbuilding Corporation until 2007.
 
On 9 February 2007, the board approved the name change to CSBC Corporation, Taiwan. Critics argued that the name change was another case of Chen Shui-bian's de-Sinicization act, while proponents argued that the name change would help to avoid potential confusion with Mainland China. In 2008 CSBC’s production value reached 1.131b USD, 54% of Taiwan’s total shipbuilding industry output for that year.

Furthermore, it has built ships, submarines and advanced naval weapons for the Republic of China Navy, patrol vessels for the Coast Guard Administration, and research vessels for the Taiwan Ocean Research Institute. CSBC is participating in the development of the first domestic Taiwanese AUV.

In 2018 CSBC entered into an alliance with Yang Ming Marine Transport Corporation, Taiwan Navigation Co Ltd, and Taiwan International Ports Corporation to provide marine services to Taiwan's burgeoning offshore wind power sector. CSBC has a joint venture with DEME Wind Engineering to offer wind farm construction in East Asia. In 2019 they were hired by Copenhagen Infrastructure Partners to transport and install wind turbines at two new wind farm off Taiwan. The two wind farms have a combined capacity of 600MW and are expected to be completed by 2023.

CSBC has been contracted to build eight conventional attack submarines for the Republic of China Navy. The model featured an X-form rudder. The initial project contract is for US$3.3 billion with projected procurement costs of US$10bn for a fleet of ten boats.

CSBC is set to deliver ten 2,800 TEU container vessels to Yang Ming Marine Transport Corporation between January 2020 and February 2021.

In July 2019 CSBC launched the CSBC No. 15, a barge designed to support CSBC’s offshore wind power business. The barge has a loading capacity of 23,000 metric tons and a loading deck bearing strength 20 metric tons per square meter. It is 41 meters wide by 140 meters long and cost NT$700 million to build.

In October 2021 CSBC launched the YM Cooperation for Yang Ming Marine Transport Corporation, the 2,940 TEU containership has a high level of modularity and environmental sustainability.

Ships built

Government   

Cheng Kung-class frigate 

Ching Chiang-class patrol ship
Kuang Hua VI-class missile boat
Dvora-class fast patrol boat
Chiayi-class offshore patrol vessel
Yushan-class landing platform dock
Indigenous Defense Submarine

Commercial 
Marlin Class Heavy Lift Ship

Fort Saint Louis class containers ships
CMA CGM Fort Saint Louis
CMA CGM Fort Saint Pierre
CMA CGM Fort Sainte Marie
CMA CGM Fort Saint Georges
Green Jade

Popular culture 
CSBC and one of its ships is featured in episode two of the National Geographic Channel’s Superstructures: Engineering Marvels.

See also
 List of companies of Taiwan
 Maritime industries of Taiwan
 Defense industry of Taiwan
 Jong Shyn Shipbuilding Company
 Lungteh Shipbuilding

References

External links

CSBC Corporation, Taiwan homepage

Manufacturing companies based in Kaohsiung
Shipbuilding companies of Taiwan
Vehicle manufacturing companies established in 1937
1937 establishments in Taiwan
Defence companies of Taiwan
Taiwanese boat builders
Maritime history of Taiwan